The Cockroaches is the debut self-titled studio album by Australian pub rock band The Cockroaches. It was released in March 1987 and peaked at number 9 on the Australian Kent Music Report.

Track listing

Charts

Certifications

References

1987 debut albums
Mushroom Records albums
The Cockroaches albums